Iran participated at the 2017 Asian Indoor and Martial Arts Games in Ashgabat, Turkmenistan from 17 September to 27 September 2017.

Competitors

Medal summary

Medal table

Medalists

Results by event

3x3 basketball

Women

Bowling

Men

Chess

Men

Women

Cue sports

Men

Women

Equestrian

Jumping

Futsal

Men

Women

Indoor athletics

Men

Women

Ju-jitsu

Men's contact

Men's ne-waza

Women's ne-waza

Kickboxing

Men

Women

Kurash

Men

Women

Muaythai

Men

Women

Sambo

Men's sport

Men's combat

Short course swimming

Men

Taekwondo

Men's poomsae

Men's kyorugi

Women's poomsae

Women's kyorugi

Tennis

Men

Women

Track cycling

Men

Women

Weightlifting

Men

Wrestling

Alysh

Men's freestyle

Men's classic style

Women's freestyle

Women's classic style

Belt wrestling

Men's freestyle

Men's classic style

Women's freestyle

Women's classic style

Kazakh kuresi

Men

Pahlavani

Men

Turkmen goresh

Men's freestyle

Men's classic style

Women's freestyle

Women's classic style

Wrestling

Men's freestyle

Men's Greco-Roman

Demonstration sports

Esports

Open

References

External links
 Official website 
 NOC Overview - Islamic Republic of Iran

Asian Indoor Martial Arts Games
2017 Asian Indoor and Martial Arts Games
Nations at the 2017 Asian Indoor and Martial Arts Games